Alistair John Dawson (25 February 1958 – 26 July 2021) was a Scottish professional football defender who spent most of his career at Rangers.

In 2011, Dawson was inducted into Rangers' Hall of Fame.

Playing career
Dawson was signed as a sixteen-year-old in 1975 by manager Jock Wallace Jr. and made his debut in a pre-season tour in Canada. He was a full back who could play on either side of the pitch.

He sustained a serious injury during a club tour of Canada, when he fractured his skull. He recovered, and became a centre back. He made a total of 316 appearances for Rangers, scoring eight goals. He received two Scottish Cup winner's medals, in 1979 and 1981, and four League Cup winner's medals – in 1979, 1984, 1985 and 1987. He was capped five times by Scotland, all while at Rangers.

After 12 years at the club, Dawson left Rangers for Blackburn Rovers in 1987 for £25,000, . He signed for Limerick in 1990 and returned to Scotland later that season with Airdrie, before becoming player/manager of Maltese league club Luxol St. Andrews. He later also played for Dingli Swallows, another Maltese team, in their historic 1994/1995 season in First Division.

Managerial career
Dawson went on to manage Hamilton Academical for a three-year spell between 1999 and 2003 where he won the Scottish Third Division title.

Death 
Dawson died on 26 July 2021, aged 63.

Honours

As manager
Hamilton Academical
Scottish Third Division: 2000–01

References

External links

1958 births
2021 deaths
People from Johnstone
Footballers from Renfrewshire
Association football defenders
Scottish footballers
Scotland international footballers
Scotland under-21 international footballers
Rangers F.C. players
Blackburn Rovers F.C. players
Airdrieonians F.C. (1878) players
Limerick F.C. players
Dingli Swallows F.C. players
Scottish Football League players
League of Ireland players
Scottish expatriate footballers
Expatriate footballers in Malta
Scottish expatriate sportspeople in Malta
Scottish football managers
Scottish expatriate football managers
Hamilton Academical F.C. managers
Scottish Football League managers
Scotland youth international footballers
St. Andrews F.C. players
St. Andrews F.C. managers